Grace Jones Morgan (November 26, 1884 – January 1, 1977) was a Canadian-born pulp fiction writer and novelist. She often used the pseudonym Bassett Morgan.

Early life
The daughter of Edwin Bassett Jones and Emily Dunkley, she was born Grace Ethel Jones in Chatham, Kent County, Ontario. In 1905, she married Thomas Russell Morgan. The family moved to California in 1918.

Career

Morgan wrote for a number of pulp fiction magazines such as Weird Tales, Argosy, Oriental Stories and Ghost Stories. Her stories were also included in a number of anthologies. She published at least three novels: Salvage All (1928), Tents of Shem (1930) and The Golden Rupee (1935), and self-published her father's autobiography Recollections of Edwin Bassett Jones.

Death
She died in Alameda at the age of 92.

References

External links 
 
 
 

1884 births
1977 deaths
Pulp fiction writers
Canadian emigrants to the United States
American women novelists
American women short story writers
20th-century American novelists
20th-century Canadian women writers
People from Chatham-Kent
Writers from Ontario
Writers from California
Canadian women novelists
Canadian women short story writers
20th-century Canadian novelists
20th-century Canadian short story writers
20th-century American short story writers
20th-century American women writers